Mekavaripalem is a village at the state of Andhra Pradesh in India, area pin code number are 521126, division name is Machilipatnam.

References 

Villages in Krishna district